The Saltonstall family is a Boston Brahmin family from the U.S. state of Massachusetts, notable for having had a family member attend Harvard University from every generation since Nathaniel Saltonstall—later one of the more principled judges at the Salem Witch Trials—graduated in 1659.

History
The Saltonstall family originated in Yorkshire, England, where the name was sometimes spelled Saltingstall. The name originates from the hamlet of Saltonstall in Halifax, West Yorkshire. The meaning is derived from Sal-ton-stall in Old English, the translation being "Farm in the Willows".

In Harvard University's Leverett House Library, there exists a commemorative wooden plaque dedicating the reading room of the library to "ten generations of Saltonstalls, who have matriculated at Harvard 1642–1959."

Notable members
 Richard Saltonstall (1521–1601), MP and Lord Mayor of London
 Sir Richard Saltonstall, colonist with the Winthrop Fleet, nephew of the above
 Nathaniel Saltonstall, judge at Salem Witch Trials
 Gurdon Saltonstall, his son, governor of Connecticut
 Gurdon Saltonstall Mumford, his great-grandson, U.S. Representative from New York
 Dudley Saltonstall, commander at Penobscot Expedition
 Leverett Saltonstall I, U.S. Representative in 1830s
 Leverett Saltonstall II, his son, Collector of the Port of Boston (1885–1889)
 Endicott Peabody Saltonstall, his son, district attorney of Middlesex County, Massachusetts (1921–1922)
 Elizabeth Saltonstall, his daughter, an artist
 Leverett A. Saltonstall, grandson of Leverett Saltonstall II, Governor of Massachusetts (1939–1945), U.S. Senator (1945–1967)
 William L. Saltonstall, his son, state senator (1967–1979)
 William G. Saltonstall, principal, Phillips Exeter Academy, 1946–1963
 John L. Saltonstall, Jr., politician

Family tree

 Richard Saltonstall (–1524) m. Isabel
 John Saltonstall (–1559) 
 Gilbert Saltonstall (1525–1598) m. Isabel Ashton (d. 1573)
 Samuel Saltonstall (1560–1612) m. (1) Anne Ramsden (1564–1611); (2) Elizabeth Ogden; (3) Elizabeth (née Bennington) Armine
 Sir Richard Saltonstall (1586–1661) m.  (1) Grace Kaye (d. 1625); m. (2) Lady Elizabeth West
 Richard Saltonstall (1610–1694) m. Muriel Gurdon (1613–1688)
 Nathaniel Saltonstall (1639–1707) m. Elizabeth Ward (1647–1714)
 Gurdon Saltonstall (1666–1724) m. 1702 (1) Elizabeth Rosewell (1679–1710); m.  (2) Mary Whittinghame (d. 1730)
 Elizabeth Saltonstall (1690–1736) m. 1710 (1) Richard Christophers (1685–1736); m. (2) Isaac Ledyard
 Sarah Saltonstall (b. 1694) m. 1715 (1) John Gardiner (1692–1725); m. 1727 (2) Samuel Davis (1692–1733)
 Rosewell Saltonstall (1701–1738) m. 1727 Mary Haynes (1703–1769)
 Katherine Saltonstall (b. 1704) m. 1727 William Brattle (1706–1776)
 Nathaniel Saltonstall (1707–1748) m. 1733 Lucretia Arnold (1706–1770)
 Gurdon Saltonstall Jr. (1708–1785) m. Rebecca Winthrop (1712–1776)
 Rebecca Winthrop Saltonstall (1734–1812) m. David Mumford (1730–1807)
 Gurdon Saltonstall Mumford (1764–1831) m. 1793 (1) Anna Van Zandt ; m. 1810 (2) Letitia Van Toren 
 Winthrop Saltonstall (1737–1811) m. Ann Wanton
 Dudley Saltonstall (1738–1796) m. 1765: Frances Babcock
 Elizabeth Saltonstall (1668–1726) m. Rev. Roland Cotton
 Col. Richard Saltonstall (1672–1714) m. Mehitabel Wainwright
 Richard Saltonstall Jr. (1703–1756) m.  (1) Abigail Waldron; m. 1738: (2) Mary Jekyll ; m. 1744: (3) Mary Cooke
 Nathaniel Saltonstall (1746–1815) m. 1780: Anna White
 Leverett Saltonstall I (1783–1845) m. Mary Elizabeth Sanders
 Leverett Saltonstall II (1825–1895) m. 1854: Rose Smith Lee (1835–1903)
 Richard Middlecott Saltonstall (1859–1922) m. Eleanor Brooks
 Leverett Saltonstall (1892–1979) m. 1916: Alice Wesselhoeft (1893–1981)
 William Lawrence Saltonstall (1927–2009) m. 1953: Jane Chandler 
 Mary Elizabeth Saltonstall (1862–1947) m. (1) Louis Agassiz Shaw; m. (2) John S. Curtis
 Louis Agassiz Shaw Jr. (1886–1940) m. Joanne Bird
 Philip Leverett Saltonstall (1867–1919) m. 1910: Frances Anne Fitch Sherwood
 Endicott Peabody Saltonstall (1872–1922) m. Elizabeth Baldwin Dupee
 Elizabeth Saltonstall (1900–1990)
 Nathaniel Saltonstall II (1784–1838) m. 1820 Caroline Saunders
 William Gurdon Saltonstall (1831–1889) m. 1816: Josephine Lee
 Robert Saltonstall (1870–1938) m. 1904 Caroline James Stevenson
 William Gurdon Saltonstall (1905–1989) m. Katharyn Saltonstall 
 Lucy Sanders Saltonstall (1871–1940) m. Neal Rantoul (1870–1934)
 John Lee Saltonstall (1878–1959) m. (1) Margaret Auchmuty Tucker; (2) Gladys Durant Rice
 John Lee Saltonstall Jr. (1916–2007) m. (1) Margaret Louise Bonnell; m. 1976: (2) Adriana Gianturco
 Rosamond Saltonstall (1881–1953) m. Charles Crooke Auchincloss (1881–1961)
 Rosamond Saltonstall Auchincloss (1907–1971) m. Burton James Lee II (1907–1962)
 Burton James Lee III (1930–2016) m. 1953: Pauline Herzog
 Richard Saltonstall Auchincloss (1909–1990) m. Mary King Wainwright (1911–2008)
 Josephine Lee Auchincloss (1912–2005) m. Benjamin Carlton Betner Jr.; m. (2) Harry Ingersoll Nicholas III
 Nathaniel Saltonstall (1674–1739), m. Dorothy Frizel
 Gilbert Saltonstall (1493–1545) m. Agnes
 Richard Saltonstall (1521–1601) m. Suzanna Poyntz 
 Eleanor Saltonstall (1554–) m. (1) Vincent Harvie; m. (2) Robert Myddelton
 Hester Saltonstall (1555–1587) m. Sir Thomas Myddelton
 Sir Thomas Myddelton m. (1) Margaret Savile; m. (2) Mary Napier
 Sir Thomas Myddelton, 1st Baronet (1624–1663) m. (1) Mary Cholmondley; m. (2) Jane Trevor
 Ann Myddelton (dsp. ) m. Edward Herbert, 3rd Baron Herbert of Chirbury
 Elizabeth Saltonstall (1556–1626) m.  Richard Wyche (1554–1621)
 Sir Peter Wyche (–1643) m. Jane Meredith
 Nathaniel Wyche (1607–1659) m. 1657 Anne (née Cranmer) Slane
 Gilbert Saltonstall m. Anne Harleston
 Richard Saltonstall m. Jane Barnard
 Peter Saltonstall (1577–1651) m. (1) Christian Pettus (d. 1646); m. (2) Anne Waller

See also
 Saltonstall Plantation, now Watertown, Massachusetts
 Myddelton family

References

External links
 Saltonstall Family Genealogy Forum

American families of English ancestry
Political families of the United States
Families from Massachusetts
Boston Brahmins